Wise Wizard Games LLC (formerly White Wizard Games) is a games company founded in 2013. They are the creators of Star Realms, Epic Card Game, Hero Realms, and Sorcerer. Their CEO, Rob Dougherty, and Creative Director, Darwin Kastle, are both in the Magic The Gathering Hall of Fame.

Awards and recognition 

Wise Wizard Games has won more than seven game-of-the-year awards for their popular card-based deck building science-fiction tabletop game, Star Realms. This awards include the 2014 Origins Award winners for Star Realms in the category Fan Favorites—Best Card Game, and the South by Southwest award for Tabletop Game of the Year in 2015.

Wise Wizard Games have received many positive reviews for Hero Realms (funded through a successful Kickstarter Campaign which raised over $555,000), Star Realms as well as for Epic Card Game(funded through a successful Kickstarter campaign which raised over $585,000).

Company Name Change 

On March 15, 2021, White Wizard Games LLC, announced that they changed the company name to Wise Wizard Games, stating a desire to have a name that best represents their vision and community. The company has plans to grow, including development of a new arena strategy game designed by Richard Garfield. Future reprints of games will use the updated company name.

References

External links 
 
 Official Shop
 Wise Wizard Games on Facebook
 Wise Wizard Games on Instagram
 Wise Wizard Games on BoardGameGeek

2013 establishments in Massachusetts
Card game publishing companies
Companies based in Massachusetts